Garkon is a panchayat village in the Aryan valley region  located in the Kargil block of Kargil district, in a rural region of the Indian union territory of Ladakh.

Geography
The village is located on the right bank of the Indus River below Dah. It is at an altitude of 9000 meters. It has six hamlets: Changra, Fantola, Haroo, Rama, Sirchangarh, and Thamtse. It also includes a hamlet named Gurgurdo, which lies five miles west of Garkone.

The stream descending from the adjoining mountains (called Baroro stream or Garkon Nala) provides water to its fields for agriculture, and drains into the Indus. The stream is neighboured  by the Gurgurdo stream in the west, which drains into the Indus at Batalik, and the Yaldor stream to the east, which joins the Indus at Dah. All three streams are accessible from the Ganokh valley to the north, by crossing mountain passes. 

The village is very close to the line of control (LOC) with Pakistan-administered Baltistan, which runs along the ridge separating the Ganokh valley with Gurgurdo, Ganokh and Yaldor valleys. Garkon, Hordas, and Batalik on the Indian side and Marol on the Pakistani side are important villages along the Indus from east to west. Gurgurdo, Garkhon, and Yaldor were focal points in the Kargil War because of their strategic location.

These villages grow apples, apricots, mulberries, and grapes. Apricot trees in particular are prevalent as in most of Ladakh, as the trees are long-lived and drought-resistant, and usually do not require irrigation, fertiliser or pesticides.

History 
At Gurgurdo, the border between Ladakh and Baltistan was set up in the 17th century followed by the battle between the kingdom of  Ali Sher Khan Anchan and Gyalpo Jamyang Namgyal. It has a sequence of seven strategically placed watchtowers, now in ruins, which previously guarded the frontier.

After the Dogra general Zorawar Singh annexed Ladakh and Baltistan, Garkon was placed in the Kargil ilaqa (subdistrict), along with Darchik and Sanacha. Gurgurdo and other northern villages remained in the Kharmang ilaqa under the administration of its traditional raja.

Shepherds from Garkon were the first to note and report the intrusion of armed Pakistani men in the 1990s. 

The presence of the Indian Army along the nearby line of control has greatly affected the traditional way of life in Garkon. For example, villagers own fewer goats due to military occupation of the high alpine summer pastures, but more donkeys; the men of the work as porters for the army, hauling supplies up to the border posts, and sometimes bringing bodies back down

Administration
Garkon is the headquarters of a gram panchayat in the Kargil district, which administers Garkon and Darchik villages.

The Garkon panchayat seat includes the following area as a panch constituency :
 Garkon
 Gargardo (Gurgurdo)
 Hordass
 Darchiks
 Sanachay

Demographics 

The village is primarily inhabited by  Brokpas.

According to census of India 2011 there are 1287 peoples living in 242 households.
The literacy rate is 50.66% .It has 202.70 hectares of land.

Maps

See also
 Aryan valley
 Batalik
 Dah
 Darchik
 Chulichan
 Hanu

Notes

References

 Sources
 
 
 
 
 

Villages in Kargil tehsil